Tukulti-Ninurta II was King of Assyria from 890 BC to 884 BC. He was the second king of the Neo Assyrian Empire.

History
His father was Adad-nirari II, the first king of the Neo-Assyrian period. Tukulti-Ninurta consolidated the gains made by his father over the Neo-Hittites, Babylonians and Arameans, and successfully campaigned in the Zagros Mountains of Iran, subjugating the newly arrived Iranian peoples of the area, the Persians and Medes, during his brief reign. 

Tukulti-Ninurta II was victorious over Ammi-Ba'al, the king of Bit-Zamani, and then entered into a treaty with him (which included prohibitions against selling horses to Assyria's foes), as a result of which Bit-Zamani became an ally, and in fact a vassal of Assyria. Ammi-Ba'al remained in power, but from that moment on, he had to support Tukulti-Ninurta II during his military expeditions to the Upper Tigris against the Hurrians and Urartians in Nairi.

Tukulti-Ninurta II developed both Nineveh and Assur, in which he improved the city walls, built palaces and temples and decorated the gardens with scenes of his military achievements.

His son, Ashurnasirpal II, succeeded him.

References

884 BC deaths
9th-century BC Assyrian kings
Year of birth unknown
Kings of the Universe